
Gmina Zgorzelec is a rural gmina (administrative district) in Zgorzelec County, Lower Silesian Voivodeship, in south-western Poland, on the German border. Its seat is the town of Zgorzelec, although the town is not part of the territory of the gmina.

Neighbouring gminas
Gmina Zgorzelec is bordered by the town of Zgorzelec and by the gminas of Bogatynia, Lubań, Pieńsk, Siekierczyn and Sulików. It also borders Germany.

Villages
The gmina contains the villages of Białogórze, Gozdanin, Gronów, Jędrzychowice, Jerzmanki, Kostrzyna, Koźlice, Koźmin, Kunów, Łagów, Łomnica, Niedów, Osiek Łużycki, Pokrzywnik, Przesieczany, Radomierzyce, Ręczyn, Sławnikowice, Spytków, Trójca, Tylice and Żarska Wieś.

References

Zgorzelec
Zgorzelec County